The Non-Partisan Solidarity Union is a political party in the Republic of China (Taiwan). It was established on 16 June 2004, led by founding Chairwoman Chang Po-ya and  emerged a major player in the national political scene during the 2004 Legislative Yuan election, with 26 candidates running for local constituency and aboriginal seats, and 6 others nominated for proportional representation seats.

History
At its founding, it was something of a big tent party in that it lacked a central ideology and fielded various candidates who ran more on their personal qualities rather than a well-articulated commonality.

The party won six seats in the 6th Legislative Yuan (2005–2008), three seats in the 7th Legislative Yuan (2008–2012), two seats in the 2012 election and one in the 2016 election.

Election results

Legislative elections

Local elections

National Assembly elections

See also
Politics of the Republic of China
List of political parties in Taiwan

Notes

Words in native languages

References